Khasan Makharbekovich Baroyev (born December 1, 1982, in Dushanbe, Tajik SSR) is a Russian Greco-Roman wrestler of Ossetian origin, who competes in the 120 kg weightclass.  He competed in the Men's Greco-Roman 120 kg at the 2004 Summer Olympics and won the gold medal. He is also the 2003 and 2006 world champion.  At the 2008 Summer Olympics, he was awarded the silver medal, which was later stripped due to doping. He also competed at the 2012 Summer Olympics.

References

External links 

1982 births
Living people
Olympic wrestlers of Russia
Wrestlers at the 2004 Summer Olympics
Wrestlers at the 2008 Summer Olympics
Wrestlers at the 2012 Summer Olympics
Olympic gold medalists for Russia
Sportspeople from Dushanbe
Olympic medalists in wrestling
World Wrestling Championships medalists
Russian male sport wrestlers
Medalists at the 2004 Summer Olympics
Competitors stripped of Summer Olympics medals
Doping cases in wrestling
Russian sportspeople in doping cases
20th-century Russian people
21st-century Russian people